Beatrice "Betsy" Abbas (née Venter born 1930s) is an South African-born Egyptian former tennis player.

She played in singles in the 1960 French Championships. She lost to Mexican player Yola Ramírez in the quarterfinals.

She played in singles at the Wimbledon in 1952. She lost to the British Pat Harrison in the second round. Her partner in women's doubles, British Doreen Spiers, lost in the third round to British players Molly Blair and Mary Halford. Her partner in mixed doubles, Władysław Skonecki, lost in the fourth round to Australian player Lew Hoad and American Dorothy Head Knode.

In 1954 Wimbledon she lost to American Margaret Osborne duPont in the third round.

Career finals

Singles (7–3)

Doubles (11–7)

References

1930s births
South African people of British descent
British emigrants to South Africa
South African female tennis players
Egyptian female tennis players
Living people